Lieutenant General Mark Evans,  (born 24 April 1953) is a retired senior officer in the Australian Army. He served as Chief of Joint Operations from July 2008 until his retirement in May 2011.

Early years
Evans was born in Kluang, Malaya, on 24 April 1953 to William Eric and Valerie Doreen Evans, and was educated in the United Kingdom.

Military career

British Army
He was a cadet in the Worcestershire Army Cadet Force, serving in Droitwich Troop, a detachment affiliated to the Queen's Own Hussars. He achieved the rare appointment of Cadet Under Officer before leaving the ACF for the Regular Army. Evans served for five years in the British Army, which included officer training at the Royal Military Academy Sandhurst and regimental duties with the Worcestershire and Sherwood Foresters Regiment in Berlin. During this time Evans served on counter insurgency operations in Northern Ireland. He was commissioned as a second lieutenant on 9 March 1973, and promoted to lieutenant on 8 September 1974. Evans resigned his British commission on 13 April 1976.

Australian Army
Evans resigned his British commission on 13 April 1976 and joined the Australian Army, where he was first posted to the 6th Battalion, Royal Australian Regiment (6 RAR). In 1979–80 he held the position (as a captain) of Officer Commanding C Company at the Australian Army Apprentice School at Balcombe, Victoria. In 1985 he served with the United Nations in the Middle East.

In 1989 he was appointed as brigade major of 3rd Brigade, and in 1991 promoted to lieutenant colonel at Australian Defence Force Headquarters. Between 1992 and 1993, he commanded 6 RAR, for which he was appointed a Member of the Order of Australia.

In December 1994, Evans was promoted to colonel, and in 1998 to brigadier commanding the 3rd Brigade. During this time he commanded the brigade on operations in East Timor, during Operation Warden, for which he was awarded the Distinguished Service Cross.

In July 2002 he was promoted to major general and assumed command of the 1st Division at Gallipoli Barracks. On 13 April 2004 he assumed the new position of Deputy Chief of Joint Operations at Headquarters Joint Operations Command in Sydney. In July 2005 he was appointed as Head Defence Personnel Executive in Canberra, and in June 2007, awarded an Officer of the Order of Australia.

On 17 June 2007, Evans assumed command of Joint Task Force 633 – Australia's contribution in the Middle East Area of Operations to the Global War on Terror. During that time he was responsible for Australian Defence Force operations in Iraq, Afghanistan and the North Persian Gulf; he was succeeded in this position by Major General Mike Hindmarsh in an official ceremony on 1 March 2008.

On 20 March 2008 it was announced that he was to be promoted to the rank of lieutenant general and would assume the position of Chief of Joint Operations from 4 July 2008. Evans retired from the Australian Army on 19 May 2011.

Personal life
Evans married Veronica Ann Higley on 9 September 1974. The couple have an adult son and daughter. Evans has a wide variety of interests that include military history, reading, walking and watching Veronica gardening.

Honours and awards

References

1953 births
Australian generals
Australian military personnel of the International Force for East Timor
Australian military personnel of the Iraq War
Australian military personnel of the War in Afghanistan (2001–2021)
British military personnel of The Troubles (Northern Ireland)
Chiefs of Joint Operations (Australia)
Graduates of the Royal Military Academy Sandhurst
Living people
Officers of the Order of Australia
Recipients of the Decoration of Merit
Recipients of the Distinguished Service Cross (Australia)
Worcestershire and Sherwood Foresters Regiment officers
English emigrants to Australia
People from Droitwich Spa